The following is a list of episodes of British television sitcom Bad Education, which was originally broadcast on BBC Three from 2012 to 2014, with a reunion special in 2022 and a fourth series in 2023.

Series overview

Episodes

Series 1 (2012)

Series 2 (2013)

Series 3 (2014)

Special (2022)

Series 4 (2023) 
All episodes of Series 4 were made available on BBC iPlayer on 15 January 2023 but aired weekly on BBC Three.

Film adaption

Ratings 
Episode ratings from BARB.

Series 1

Series 2

Series 3

References

BBC-related lists
Lists of British sitcom episodes